The Marriage Revolution (Spanish:La revolución matrimonial) is a 1974 Spanish comedy film directed by José Antonio Nieves Conde and starring Analía Gadé, José Luis López Vázquez and Ismael Merlo.

Cast

References

Bibliography 
 Pascual Cebollada & Luis Rubio Gil. Enciclopedia del cine español: cronología. Ediciones del Serbal, 1996.

External links 
 

1974 comedy films
Spanish comedy films
1974 films
1970s Spanish-language films
Films directed by José Antonio Nieves Conde
Films with screenplays by Rafael Azcona
1970s Spanish films